John Brogan may refer to Scottish association football players:

 John Brogan (footballer, born 1954), record goalscorer for St. Johnstone F.C.
 John Brogan (footballer, born 1958), defender for Clyde F.C.